The V Bolivarian Games (Spanish: Juegos Bolivarianos) were a multi-sport event held between November 20 - December 5, 1965, in Quito and Guayaquil, Ecuador. The Games were organized by the Bolivarian Sports Organization (ODEBO).

Separate inauguration ceremonies for the Games were held in both venues.  In Quito, the Games were officially opened by Ecuadorian president and chairman of the military junta Ramón Castro Jijón.  Torch lighter was former long distance runner, 10,000 metres gold medal winner at the I Bolivarian Games Luís Calderón.  The athlete's oath was sworn by the president's sister, former sprinter and 50 metres gold medal winner at the I Bolivarian Games Carola Castro.  In Guayaquil, the Games were officially opened by the president of the organizing committee, Jaime García Naranjo.  Torch lighter was Edgar Andrade.  The athlete's oath was sworn by baseball player Juvenal Sáenz.

A detailed history of the early editions of the Bolivarian Games between 1938 and 1989 was published in a book written (in Spanish) by José Gamarra Zorrilla, former president of the Bolivian Olympic Committee, and first president (1976-1982) of ODESUR.  Gold medal winners from Ecuador were published by the Comité Olímpico Ecuatoriano.

Venues

In Quito

In Guayaquil

Participation 
About 1200 athletes from 6 countries were reported to participate:

Sports 
The following sports were explicitly mentioned:

Aquatic sports 
 Diving
 Swimming
 Athletics
 Baseball
 Basketball
 Boxing
 Chess
Cycling 
 Road cycling
 Track cycling
 Equestrian
 Fencing
 Football
 Golf
 Gymnastics (artistic)
 Judo
 Pelota Nacional†
 Sailing
 Shooting
 Table tennis
 Tennis
 Volleyball
 Weightlifting
 Wrestling

†: Exhibition event.

Medal count
The medal count for these Games is tabulated below.  This table is sorted by the number of gold medals earned by each country.  The number of silver medals is taken into consideration next, and then the number of bronze medals.

References 

Bolivarian Games
Bolivarian Games
Bolivarian Games
Bolivarian Games
Bolivarian Games
Multi-sport events in Ecuador
20th century in Quito
20th century in Guayaquil
Sports competitions in Quito
Sports competitions in Guayaquil
November 1965 sports events in South America
December 1965 sports events in South America